is the sixth single by Japanese entertainer Miho Nakayama. Written by Takashi Matsumoto and Tetsuya Komuro, the single was released on July 15, 1986, by King Records.

Background and release
"Jingi Aishite Moraimasu" was used as the theme song of the Toei film Be-Bop High School: Yotaro Lamentation, which also starred Nakayama.

"Jingi Aishite Moraimasu" peaked at No. 4 on Oricon's weekly singles chart and sold over 138,000 copies.

Track listing

Charts
Weekly charts

Year-end charts

References

External links

1986 singles
1986 songs
Japanese-language songs
Miho Nakayama songs
Songs with lyrics by Takashi Matsumoto (lyricist)
Songs written by Tetsuya Komuro
King Records (Japan) singles